Typhoon Yunya,  known in the Philippines as Typhoon Diding, was a strong tropical cyclone whose landfall in the Philippines coincided with the 1991 eruption of Mount Pinatubo. A small tropical cyclone, Yunya rapidly developed from a tropical disturbance near East Samar on June 11. By June 13 the storm had reached typhoon status as it moved west-northwest near the Philippines. The storm struck southern Luzon early on June 15 as a minimal typhoon before moving over the South China Sea later that day. After turning north and weakening to a tropical depression, the system brushed the southern tip of Taiwan on June 16 before dissipating the following day.

Across the Philippines, Yunya produced heavy rains that triggered significant flooding. Hundreds of homes and several bridges were washed away by swollen rivers. Six people were killed as a direct result of the storm, 2,013 homes were destroyed, and 24 others were damaged. Although the storm itself caused significant damage, the worst effects were related to the system's heavy rains mixing with volcanic ash from Mount Pinatubo, creating massive lahars that killed 320 people.

Meteorological history

On June 11, 1991, a tropical disturbance developed east of East Samar. Situated to the southwest of a tropical upper tropospheric trough, the system experienced low wind shear and gradually intensified as it moved northwestward. The following day, the Japan Meteorological Agency (JMA) began monitoring the system as a tropical depression. At 15:00 UTC on June 12, the Joint Typhoon Warning Center (JTWC) issued a Tropical Cyclone Formation Alert on the depression. Around this time, the storm began a period rapid development and a tiny central dense overcast formed. Although Yunya was already a tropical storm, the JTWC did not issue their first advisory on the system until early on June 13, at which time they assigned it the name Yunya.

Throughout June 13, subsidence around the periphery of Yunya allowed the system to develop good outflow. As a result, the storm attained typhoon status later that day before strengthening slowed. By June 14, Yunya turned towards the west-northwest in response to a subtropical ridge to the north. Around the same time, the JMA assessed Yunya to have been slightly weaker, with peak winds estimated at  along with a pressure of 950 mbar (hPa; 28.05 inHg).

Within hours of reaching its peak strength on June 14, strong wind shear associated with a second subtropical ridge over Asia impacted the typhoon. Due to the system's small size, the shear was able to disrupt the cyclone's core and cause rapid weakening as it approached southern Luzon. Around 00:00 UTC on June 15, Yunya made landfall just north of Dingalan Bay as a minimal typhoon and weakened to a tropical storm shortly thereafter. As the storm moved across Luzon, Mount Pinatubo, a volcano in the Zambales Mountains on the island's western side, was experiencing a major eruption—the second-largest to occur during the 20th century. Due to Yunya's circulation, the massive cloud of ash produced by the eruption was moistened and redistributed over the Philippines instead of blowing out to sea, greatly exacerbating the impact of the event.

Later on June 15, Yunya emerged into the South China Sea as a minimal tropical storm. Persistent wind shear prevented the system from strengthening and the storm ultimately degraded into a tropical depression by June 16. Having turned north within a break in the subtropical ridge, Yunya brushed the southern tip of Taiwan late on June 16 before dissipating the following day within the westerlies.

Preparations and impact

On June 14, the Philippine Atmospheric, Geophysical and Astronomical Services Administration raised storm warnings in advance of Typhoon Yunya for much of Luzon and areas south of Manila. As a result, 60,000 individuals were evacuated. Landslides on June 14 destroyed bridges in Santa Fe and homes in nearby Castillejos were washed away. By June 15, air-borne ash combined with the typhoon's rainfall, resulting in widespread travel disruptions and structural collapses. The mixture also made it appear as through it was nighttime during the middle of the day, prompting concern from residents. The wind from the typhoon carried ash within  from Pinatubo, including to Manila, which prompted most of the airports in the country to close and Philippine Airlines to cancel all domestic and international flights through June 19. Heavy rains also resulted in lahars along mountains between the Gumain River to the Sacobia River and between Sacobia River to the O'Donnell River. These lahars inundated crops and homes, especially along the Abacan River. As a result of the lahars, some buildings and all bridges in Angeles City were destroyed. Moreover, 320 people were killed and 279 others were injured. The United States Geological Survey believes that the death toll from the lahars would have been far lower if not for Yunya.

In addition to the lahars, widespread flooding also took place in Luzon as rivers overtopped their banks. Elsewhere, a person was killed by debris in Manila. Across Olongapo City, power was knocked out, and one person was killed after the roof of a bus terminal collapsed under the weight of ash and rain. Two people died and three others were injured in an accident near Clark Air Base, where power was also knocked out. Along the Sacobia River in Pampanga, at least 170 homes were washed away due to the storm. The Abacan bridge spanning the Abacan River collapsed with a truck carrying three people, and an empty car. It is unknown whether the three people survived. A total of 2 people were killed and at least 12 warranted evacuation in Angeles City when the roof of a bus terminal, where 100 people were riding out the storm, operated by Philippine Rabbit Bus Lines collapsed. Civil defense officials confirmed that five other bridges collapsed in Pampanga and Zambales provinces. All crops were destroyed throughout Iriga. Overall, 2,013 homes were destroyed and 24 others were damaged during the passage of the typhoon. A total of 2,035 families or 10,185 people were evacuated to shelters. Excluding from lahars, six people were killed by Yunya.

See also

1991 Pacific typhoon season
Typhoon Mike (Ruping, 1990)
Tropical Storm Thelma (Uring, 1991), one of the deadliest tropical cyclones to hit the Philippines in recent recorded history
Typhoon Angela (Rosing, 1995)
Typhoon Durian (Reming, 2006)
Tropical Storm Fung-wong (Mario, 2014)
Typhoon Vongfong (Ambo, 2020)

Notes

References

1991 Pacific typhoon season
Typhoons
Typhoons in the Philippines
1991 disasters in the Philippines
1991 natural disasters